
Mogilno County is a unit of territorial administration and local government (powiat) in Kuyavian-Pomeranian Voivodeship, north-central Poland. It was formed on January 1, 1999, as a result of the Polish local government reforms passed in 1998.

As of 2006 its total population is 45,756, out of which the population of Mogilno is 11,836, that of Strzelno is 5,631, and the rural population is 28,289.

Neighbouring counties
Mogilno County is bordered by Inowrocław County to the north-east, Konin County and Słupca County to the south, Gniezno County to the west, and Żnin County to the north-west.

Administrative division
The county is subdivided into four gminas (two urban-rural and two rural). These are listed in the following table, in descending order of population.

References
   Polish official population figures 2019

 
Mogilno